Sycaeboae is the name of a Thracian tribe, which was mentioned by Polyaenus.

See also
List of Thracian tribes

References

Ancient tribes in Thrace
Thracian tribes